Guðrún P. Helgadóttir (April 19, 1922 – July 5, 2006) was an Icelandic writer, poet, scholar and educator and is widely recognized in Iceland.

Biography
Guðrún graduated from Menntaskólinn í Reykjavík (Reykjavik Junior College) in 1941 and the Icelandic College of Education in 1945. She obtained a BA degree in Icelandic and English from University of Iceland in 1949 and dr. phil. degree from University of Oxford in 1968. Her adviser at Oxford was Professor Gabriel Turville-Petre and her thesis was on one of the Sagas of Icelanders, the Saga of Hrafn Sveinbjarnarson. It was published in a revised form by Clarendon Press in 1987. Guðrún taught Icelandic at several schools in Iceland and for most of her teaching career she was a principal of Kvennaskólinn í Reykjavík. The school was established in 1874 and was the first school open for women in Iceland at the secondary level. Guðrún was regarded as an outstanding teacher of Icelandic and literature and leader in education.

Guðrún's scholarly work focused mainly on two areas i.e. women's literature and history of medicine. She was a pioneer in women's studies with her review of female poets in Iceland from the 9th to the 19th century. She also wrote a biography of a pioneer female poet in Iceland, Júlíana Jónsdóttir. Guðrún published her own poetry in 1982. Her career in the history medicine started with her doctoral thesis on the Saga of Hrafn Sveinbjarnarson who was a chieftain and a leading medical man in Iceland and Nordic countries in the 13th century. Subsequently, she wrote on various aspects of history of medicine in medieval times. She wrote biographies of her father as a physician and grandfather a homeopath.

Guðrún was active in many other areas. She was president of the Women's Alliance in Reykjavik and chairman of the Memorial fund of The National Hospital of Iceland (Landspítali) and a founding member in 1975 of the Delta Kappa Gamma Society in Iceland. Her parents were Dr. Helgi Ingvarsson chief physician at Vífilstadir Tuberculosis Hospital in Iceland and his wife Guðrún Lárusdóttir.

Honours
Guðrún received several honors for her work most notably the Knight's Cross in 1964, the Commander's Cross in 1971 and the Commander's Cross with Star in 1989 Order of the Falcon invested by the president of Iceland.

References 

1922 births
2006 deaths
Gudrún P. Helgadóttir
Gudrún P. Helgadóttir